Javier Sanso  (born on 2 April 1969) in Palma de Mallorca, is a Spanish professional navigator and skipper.

Vendee Globe
He has tried to complete the Vendee Globe starting twice firstly in fourth edition in the 2000–2001 Vendée Globe on Old Spice he retired after 42 days at sea because of the breakage. He then took part in the 2012–2013 Vendée Globe but capsized (keel break) on 3 February 2013, 360 miles south of Sao Miguel in the Azores during his ascent of the Atlantic. He was rescued twelve hours later by the Portuguese Maritime Rescue Service.

Race Result Highlights

References

External links 
 

1969 births
People from Palma de Mallorca
Living people

IMOCA 60 class sailors
Spanish male sailors (sport)
2000 Vendee Globe sailors
2012 Vendee Globe sailors
Spanish Vendee Globe sailors